The United News, formerly the United Daily Press, is a national broadsheet newspaper published in Manila, the Philippines.  Published by United Daily Press, Inc., the newspaper is the English-language edition of the United Daily News, the Philippines' second-largest Chinese-language newspaper.

Editorial team
The editorial team includes Mike G. Jamisola as editor-in-chief, Jude Torres as managing editor and Delfin Sd. Perez as business section editor. Columnists include Alice H. Reyes, Angie Corro and Atty. Romulo Lumauig.

References

External links
United News website

National newspapers published in the Philippines
English-language newspapers published in the Philippines
Newspapers published in Metro Manila
Daily newspapers published in the Philippines